Liberal Democrat Friends of Israel (LDFI) is an associated organisation whose stated objective is to 'maximise support for the State of Israel within the British Liberal Democrat Party', and to 'promote policies which lead to peace and security for Israel within a Middle East peace settlement'.

The President of Liberal Democrat Friends of Israel is Baron Palmer. The Vice Presidents are Alan Beith, Baron Alliance, and Baroness Ludford. The Chair is Gavin Stollar and the Vice Chair is Jonathan Davies.

History 
The Liberal Friends of Israel group was the first friends of Israel group in the Parliament of the United Kingdom.

The SDP Friends of Israel group was formed in July 1981 with Bill Rodgers as President.

The Liberal Friends of Israel and the SDP Friends of Israel groups were amalgamated into the Liberal Democrat Friends of Israel when the parties merged in 1988.

In July 2020, the LDFI issued a statement expressing "deep concern" about plans by the Israeli Government to annex part of the West Bank.

In October 2020, the LDFI and the Board of Deputies of British Jews jointly wrote to Mendip District Council urging it to adopt the International Holocaust Remembrance Alliance definition of antisemitism, after the council voted unanimously against adopting it.

Members of LDFI

In alphabetical order, members of Liberal Democrat Friends of Israel include:

Alan Beith, Vice President of LDFI
Ed Fordham, PPC for Hampstead and Kilburn in 2010 General Elections
Matthew Harris, PPC for Hendon in the 2010 General Elections
Baron Palmer, President of LDFI
Gavin Stollar, Chairman
Baroness Ludford, MEP for London

See also
Labour Friends of Israel
Conservative Friends of Israel
Northern Ireland Friends of Israel
European Friends of Israel
Friends of Israel Initiative

References

External links
Official website
Speech to the Liberal Democrat Friends of Israel, Charles Kennedy, 4 November 2004

Organisations associated with the Liberal Democrats (UK)
Israel friendship associations
Political advocacy groups in the United Kingdom
Israel–United Kingdom relations
United Kingdom friendship associations
Jewish British history
Lobbying in the United Kingdom